Robert Worrincy (born 9 July 1985) is an English rugby league footballer who plays as er for Hunslet RLFC in RFL League 1. 

He previously played in the Super League for the Castleford Tigers, and in the second tier for the Sheffield Eagles over three separate spells, two separate spells at Halifax in the second tier, as well as the Dewsbury Rams in the RFL Championship. Worrincy also spent time as a rugby union footballer, playing a season as a winger for Doncaster in the second tier of English rugby union.

Background
Worrincy was born in Leeds, West Yorkshire, England. He is of Anglo-Nigerian-Welsh heritage. He began playing rugby league in the London area, and won the BARLA Youth Player of the Year Award in 2003.

He is the elder brother of the rugby league player; Michael Worrincy.

Career
In 2004, he made his profession debut for Castleford Tigers in the Super League. He went on to have multiple spells with the Sheffield Eagles and Halifax in the Kingstone Press Championship. 

In March 2014, Worrincy was suspended for six months after breaching the Rugby Football League's rules on betting. The ban was extended to nine months following a failed appeal.

In November 2017 he signed to play for Dewsbury Rams. 

In 2021, while at Sheffield, Worrincy announced his retirement from the game. He scored a try in the last minute of his final game in 78-10 loss at Featherstone Rovers.

In May 2022, Worrincy came out of retirement and signed for Rochdale Hornets.

References

External links

 (archived by web.archive.org) Sheffield Eagles profile
 (archived by web.archive.org) Profile at halifaxrlfc.co.uk
Statistics at rugbyleagueproject.org
 (archived by web.archive.org) WELSH STUDENTS CRUSH FRENCH
Worrincy has no worries
Featherstone Rovers 22-23 Halifax (aet)
Halifax 34-46 Bradford Bulls

1985 births
Living people
Black British sportspeople
Castleford Tigers players
Dewsbury Rams players
Doncaster R.F.C. players
English people of Nigerian descent
English people of Welsh descent
English rugby league players
English rugby union players
Halifax R.L.F.C. players
Hull F.C. players
Hunslet R.L.F.C. players
London Broncos players
Rugby league players from Leeds
Rugby league wingers
Rugby union players from Leeds
Sheffield Eagles players